This is a list of college field hockey coaches with 300 wins Karen Shelton is the all-time leader in wins with 714. Jan Hutchinson of Bloomsburg is the all-time leader in winning percentage with a record of 591—75—20 for an .876 winning percentage.

Key

Coaches

''Unless otherwise noted, statistics are correct through the end of the 2019 season.

References

 
Field Hockey